Uttam Yudh Seva Medal (UYSM; Great War Service Medal) is one of India's military decorations for Wartime Distinguished Service. It is awarded for a high degree of distinguished services in an operational context. "Operational context" includes times of war, conflict, or hostilities. The award is a wartime equivalent of Ati Vishisht Seva Medal, which is a Peacetime Distinguished Service decoration. Uttam Yudh Seva Medal may be awarded posthumously.

Eligibility
The Uttam Yudh Seva Medal may be awarded posthumously. It is awarded for distinguished service of an exceptional order during war/conflict/hostilities. It may be awarded to all ranks of the Army, the Navy and the Air Force including those of Territorial Army Units, Auxiliary and Reserve Forces and other lawfully constituted Armed forces when embodied, as well as nursing Officers and other members of the Nursing Services in the Armed Forces.

Design
The medal is circular in shape, 35mm in diameter and fitted to a plain horizontal bar with standard fittings. The medal is of gold gilt. The medal has on its obverse the State emblem and the inscriptions in Hindi and English. On its reverse, it has a five pointed star. The riband is Gold in colour with two red vertical stripes dividing it into three equal parts.

If a recipient of the medal is subsequently awarded the medal again, every such further award shall be recognized by a Bar to be attached to the riband by which the medal is suspended. For every such Bar, a miniature insignia of a pattern approved by the Government shall be added to the riband when worn alone.

See also
 Ati Vishisht Seva Medal - the peace-time equivalent

References

External links 
Indian Army's page on Uttam Yudh Seva Medal

Military awards and decorations of India